Passenger rail franchising in Great Britain is the system of contracting the operation of the passenger services on the railways of Great Britain to private companies, which has been in effect since 1996 and was greatly altered in 2020, with rail franchising being effectively abolished in May 2021.

The system was created as part of the privatisation of British Rail, the former state-owned railway operator, and involved franchises being awarded by the government to train operating companies (TOCs) through a process of competitive tendering. Franchises usually lasted for a minimum of seven years and covered a defined geographic area or service type; by design, franchises were not awarded on an exclusive basis, and day-to-day competition with other franchises and open access operators was possible, albeit occurring on a limited number of services. Over the years, the system evolved, most notably reducing the initial 25 franchises to 17 through a series of mergers. Four franchises are currently in public ownership under the 'operator of last resort' arrangement.

The Government initially suspended rail franchising in order to maintain service as passenger demand fell due to the COVID-19 pandemic, but on 21 September 2020 permanently abolished the rail franchising policy. Emergency arrangements (which effectively convert the franchises into concessions) remain until it legislates for a replacement to the system, likely to be a permanent concession system as is already in place in some urban areas.

The system only covers the railways of Great Britain (and the Isle of Wight); the railways in Northern Ireland are owned and operated by the state-owned company NI Railways.

Process

Tendering, monitoring and termination
Railway franchises are decided by the UK Government's Department for Transport (DfT), who design the boundaries and terms of service, and award contracts to the train operating companies. Under the devolved administration arrangements, franchises for ScotRail and Caledonian Sleeper are awarded by Transport Scotland and the Wales & Borders franchise is awarded by Transport for Wales.

Prior to formally tendering a specific franchise, the DfT publishes a Prior Information Notice (PIN) outlining the basic details, and opens a consultation with relevant transport authorities, devolved administrations and the Transport Focus watchdog. At the end of this process, a formal Invitation To Tender (ITT) setting out the detailed terms of the proposed franchise agreement is sent to the three to five prospective bidders who have been identified as pre-qualified. ITT's may include a range of variations for consideration by the prospective bidder, who may also submit variations themselves. The franchise is awarded to the bid which is deemed most viable, and which offers the best value and reliability. If relevant, bidders' past performance is also considered.

Performance is monitored throughout the contract period.

In contrast to earlier bail-outs, following the 2004 changes in approach to cost/revenue risk, unless there are exceptional circumstances, the DfT's policy toward failing franchises is not to rescue them with further financial assistance. Instead, DfT will hold them to the agreement and terminate the franchise early, and then run the franchise directly as an operator of last resort (OOLR), pending a re-tendering. Agreements also contain a cross-default clause, which allows other franchises also held by the company or an affiliate to be terminated.

Financing
Rail franchise holders in Great Britain accept commercial risk, although there are clauses in newer franchises which offer some compensation for lower-than-expected revenue (and also claw back some excess profits, should these occur).

The main costs incurred by franchisees are track access charges (paid to Network Rail); other significant costs come from staffing, leasing stations (from NR) and rolling stock (from ROSCOs). Franchisees also pay for light maintenance of stock, with heavy work being done as part of the ROSCO lease. The main revenue stream is from fares, supplemented by the franchise subsidy in cases where there is a shortfall. In addition, franchisees are allowed to sub-let commercial units directly in leased stations.

Franchises and concessions

Current franchises

Concessions
A small number of urban railway systems are not franchised but are contracted out as a concession instead. Concession holders are paid a fee to run the service, which is usually tightly specified by the awarding authority. They do not take commercial risk, although there are usually penalties and rewards specified in the contract for large variations in performance.

Examples

Open-access operators
An open-access operator is a train operating company that is not subject to franchising or concessions, but instead purchases individual train paths from a railway infrastructure company such as Network Rail. These operators include Eurostar, Grand Central, Heathrow Express, Hull Trains, Lumo and Pre Metro Operations (providing a shuttle service on the Stourbridge Town branch line).

Former franchises
Prior to privatisation, the passenger services of British rail were organised into three units:
 InterCity for long distance express services
 Network SouthEast (NSE) for the commuter services from South East England into the various London termini
 Regional Railways (RR) for services in all other areas

They then underwent further reorganisation in preparation for franchising, being split up into 25 train operating units (TOUs) or that were gradually incorporated as separate, shadow businesses operating as 'shadow franchises' that negotiated contracts individually with regulators, Railtrack (the infrastructure and major station owner) and ROSCOs (the rolling stock leasing companies) before being sold off in 1996 and 1997.

History

1996–1997: Genesis to sale
The franchising system was created by the Railways Act 1993 as part of the privatisation of British Rail by the Government of John Major, and the first franchises came into effect in 1996. Prior to this, the railway system had been owned and operated by the government-owned corporation British Rail (BR), which has since been wound up.

Prime Minister John Major envisaged splitting up the railways and returning ownership to an equivalent of the Big Four railway companies that had existed before the creation of British Rail. The Treasury advocated an alternative plan put forward by the Adam Smith Institute which separated railway infrastructure from train service operation and contracted out passenger services to seven-year franchises. This scheme formed the basis of the system which was implemented, which saw the creation of 25 shadow franchises, to be sold off in a process managed by the Director of Passenger Rail Franchising, which specified service levels and public subsidies that were to be paid to operators. The legislation allowed BR to bid for franchises, if the DPRF agreed, but in practice he never did.

Under the original 1993 legislation, the Franchise Director set out the minimum service levels of a franchise in a Passenger Service Requirement (PSR), being the current BR timetable in the case of the first sell-offs, and put this out to competitive tender. Winning bidders were decided on a pure cost basis – those who offered to pay the highest premium, or receive lowest subsidy, would run the franchise. Once signed, franchise agreements could only be terminated under certain conditions, namely not meeting the PSR, although fines were available as an intermediate step.

The Treasury had initially envisaged franchises to be around 3 years long, to promote sustained competition, however as it became clear that potential buyers were not interested in such short terms, it was announced in 1995 that franchises would be around 5 to 7 years long, or longer if major investment was required. The first franchise agreements to be signed were for the South West and Great Western franchises, on 19 and 20 December 1995 respectively. The first passenger train service operated by a privatised franchise was the South West Trains 05:10 Twickenham to Waterloo on 4 February 1996, although this came after the first privately run service, which ironically was a rail replacement bus service covering the early morning Fishguard to Cardiff journey in South Wales, due to engineering works.

As the program progressed, all franchises had been awarded and commenced by 1 April 1997, the last being ScotRail. OPRAF was initially criticised for taking too long, but answered that most of the delays were outside of their control, and were indeed caused by the government itself. The first four franchise competitions only attracted four bidders each, well below government expectations, although competition increased as the program went on and investors gained more surety over the way the system was to operate as a whole. Ultimately, although there were 25 franchises, the eventual buyers came from only 13 different companies. Many were bus companies, with the hoped-for interest from airlines and shipping groups failing to be converted into solid bids. In addition, despite several bids, due to difficulties in raising finance, only three bids from management buyout groups had been successful.

National Express was the winner of the most franchises, with five (Gatwick Express, Midland Mainline, North London, Central Trains and ScotRail). Prism Rail came next, with four (LTS, Wales & West, Valley Lines and WAGN). Connex, Virgin Rail Group and MTL all captured two each, with the franchises they won being closely related (South Central and South Eastern for Connex, CrossCountry and West Coast for Virgin, and Mersey Electrics and North East for MTL). Stagecoach also won two, although the second was the tiny Island Line, which would eventually be merged with their main win, South West Trains. Great Western Holdings also won two, on opposite sides of the country – Great Western and North Western; FirstGroup, who had won a single franchise in Great Eastern, were a minority partner in GWH. Their March 1998 buyout of the other GWH partners increased their total to three.

In the end, most of the franchises were awarded for lengths from 7 to 7 and a half years. Only seven franchises were longer – two for 10 years (Great Western and Midland Mainline), and five for 15 years (LTS, Gatwick Express, South Eastern, Cross Country and West Coast). Only one was shorter, the 5 year award for Island Line.

1997–2005: Strategic Rail Authority

The Labour government elected in 1997 chose not to reverse the privatisation process, although they set out a number of reform proposals, including the setting up of a new Strategic Rail Authority (SRA), whose functions would absorb the responsibilities of the Franchising Director, as well as some duties previously performed by the Rail Regulator and the Department of Transport's Railways Directorate. Since this would take time as it involved legislation, in the meantime the SRA was established in 'shadow' form, in June 1999. Part of their brief was to ensure the railways operated as "a coherent network, not merely a collection of different franchises". Their goals were closely aligned with the government's wider objectives, set out in July 2000 as the ten-year plan, Transport 2010.

In 2000 the shadow SRA announced plans to use the re-franchising of the 18 shorter term (7-year) franchises expiring by 2004 to make various changes aimed at improving service grouping and lengthening franchises, with the aim of making them more robust and better able to invest in services. It aimed to have these proposals agreed by Autumn 2001, and published a timetable for the letting of 9 franchises in three tranches. These long-term plans were disrupted in 2001/2 by the impact of the Hatfield rail crash, which led to the nationalisation of Railtrack, the owner of the railway infrastructure, to create Network Rail. On 1 February 2001, the position of Franchising Director was abolished by the Transport Act 2000 and the passenger rail franchising functions were formally transferred to the SRA.

The SRA began to doubt its new long-term strategy as it failed to negotiate a 20-year franchise for the East Coast due to uncertainty over Railtack's ability to finance planned upgrades, and abandoned bidding negotiations in July 2001 after 21 months. Instead it elected for a short 2-year extension, hoping the situation would be clearer by then. Short-term extensions were also to be considered for other 7-year franchise renegotiations facing similar issues, which had not yet reached a finalised agreement.

By the end of 2002, the SRA had also changed its policy on Franchising Agreements to introduce various other performance criteria in addition to keeping to the PSR, aimed at raising the overall quality of passenger journeys. Franchise lengths would be kept to between five and eight years, but extensions would be permitted if Key Performance Indicators (KPIs) were met. It also changed the approach to risks in costs and revenues, and introduced incentive payments for performance and long term investment. The changes took effect after the awards for the Transpennine and Wales & Borders franchises, which were already too advanced. The tendering process was also simplified, giving more details up front in order to speed up the process and make bid assessment more robust. Through the use of tactical short-term extensions, the SRA planned to achieve the changes in franchise redesign and smooth out the timetable for re-franchising, aiming for two or three awards per year.

In February 2002, the Chiltern franchise became the first to be awarded for a 20-year duration, the winning bidder being Chiltern Railways, the incumbent franchisee since privatisation.

In August 2003, FirstGroup purchased GB Railways, the first time since privatisation that a TOC had been bought by another TOC.

2005–2009: Direct government responsibility 
The Railways Act 2005 abolished the SRA and transferred the responsibility for franchises in England and Wales directly to the government through the Secretary of State for Transport, with the Welsh Government being given a direct role over services in Wales. Responsibility for the ScotRail franchise was passed to the Scottish Government. The 2005 Act also gave local and devolved administrations the ability to alter fares up or down, provided they funded the extra cost, or used the savings on other transport modes. In a move designed to make them accountable for their decisions in this new role, English passenger transport executives were no longer direct parties to franchise agreements, instead gaining a role in long-term planning and a statutory right to consultation over franchises in their areas. In London, the Act required the DfT to consult Transport for London on any franchise with services to, from or within London. In July 2007, these powers were extended, with measures designed to protect those outside London, with the DfT as the arbiter of disputes.

In October 2007, the European Union set the maximum length of a rail franchise at 22.5 years: 15 years initially, with a 50% extension in certain circumstances.

By 2007 the Labour government was happy with how the franchise system was leading to improvements in customer satisfaction and better trains, crediting TOC's use of their freedoms under the system to deliver passenger growth. The 2008 recession sparked fears over franchisees' ability to survive, although the government allayed these fears in 2009.

Passenger Rail Franchising has been examined by the National Audit Office and a report was published on 15 October 2008.

In response to continuing criticism, changes in how franchises were agreed and monitored continued; by 2010 agreements contained penalties for failure to increase reliability, and the number of KPIs had been reduced.

2010–2012: Pauses and reviews

The coalition government elected in May 2010 paused re-franchising pending a review, which was published in January 2011. As a result, they reformed the system further to increase operators' flexibility, with greater incentives for cost reduction by operators, and franchise terms dealt with on a case-by-case approach. They extended the standard franchise term to between 15 and 22.5 years (with shorter terms where expedient), ending the Cap and Collar approach to risk which provided for risk-sharing with government regarding future demand, and introducing profit sharing and review points. The new system, to be applied first with the InterCity West Coast bid, also took a less prescriptive approach to service specification and introduced measures to tackle crowding and changes to the way quality measurement was approached. Because of the increased future risks carried by operators, the government required a large financial surety to discourage early contract default.

In 2012 the franchising system essentially collapsed in the wake of the West Coast controversy (see below). As a result of the crisis, the government commissioned two inquiries, the Laidlaw inquiry to look into the cause of the West Coast failure, and the Brown review to investigate the wider franchise system. The Laidlaw report was published in December 2012, and found the DfT to be primarily responsible for the West Coast failure, having made several errors in its financial modelling. All three outstanding franchise competitions – Great Western, Essex Thameside and Thameslink – were paused pending the outcome of the Brown review. It was published in January 2013, and concluded there were no fundamental flaws in the system, but made 11 recommendations on how it could be improved. One recommendation was to spread out the re-franchising schedule to avoid bunching, which the government acted upon in committing to holding no more than four competitions per year, and staggering the East and West coast awards. Another of Brown's recommendations was the breaking up of the standard franchise period into two terms: an initial term of between 7 and 10 years, followed by an automatic extension of a further 3 to 5 years, should performance criteria have been met (but also possibly being granted if they weren't, to dissuade abuse by under-performing TOCs). It also recommended further transfer of powers to local and devolved administrations.

The West Coast controversy led to the introduction of the Direct Award concept, whereby the government can award a franchise that is up for renewal directly to the incumbent rather than through a tendering process, but only if the operator's proposed terms match the government's projected expectations of future performance based on its past record. If a reasonable contract cannot be drawn up through negotiation, the franchise is then re-let as normal. In the following few years, most franchises were renewed as Direct Awards, in part to achieve the smoothing-out of the schedule recommended by Brown.

2013–2019: Direct awards 
Following the pause for the Brown report, the system resumed in 2013; the DfT published a revised timetable in March 2013, with the first tender being concluded in May, the direct award for the Essex Thameside franchise.

In 2014, the DfT was re-organised, with responsibility for rail franchising becoming part of the new Office of Rail Passenger Services's remit under an externally recruited chief, the ORPS itself being part of a new Rail Executive within the DfT.

In January 2015, as part of its statutory duty to promote competition, the Competition & Markets Authority (CMA) launched a policy review to determine if there were opportunities to improve the current system outside the established areas of competition, namely the bidding process and the open access operators. In July 2015 it identified four possible areas for reform: an increased role for open access operators, having two successful bidders for each franchise, having more overlapping franchises and having multiple operators with licences on each route. The regulator (by then renamed the Office of Rail & Road) evaluated the CMA's options, leading to a final report in March 2016.

Since 2020: Suspension and abolition 
In response to the coronavirus pandemic, on 23 March 2020 the UK government took emergency measures which suspended all passenger rail franchise agreements for six months. Passenger numbers had already dropped by 70% by that date, leading to a significant drop in the income of the operating companies, which responded by cancelling and reconfiguring services. The government agreed with the companies that passengers holding advance tickets would be able to get a full refund.

Under the Emergency Measure Agreements (EMA), which were backdated to 1 March, the normal financial mechanisms of the franchise agreements were suspended so that operating companies would not get into financial difficulty. All revenue would be paid to the government, who would pay the operators' costs plus a management fee of up to 2% of their pre-pandemic costs.

In September, the government extended the EMAs by 18 months and announced plans to end the system of rail franchising, instead moving to a concession-based model, as already operated by Merseyrail, TfL Rail and London Overground. This would see all aspects of the service set by a new public body, with each operation run by a private company who would receive a fee under a management contract. In May 2021, the public body was named as Great British Railways.

On 20 September 2020, the first set of EMAs expired. They were replaced in most cases by Emergency Recovery Measures Agreements (ERMAs) with durations of between six and 18 months; under these the Department for Transport (DfT) continues to receive the revenue and pay most of the train operating companies' costs. There are some exceptions to the standard pattern:

 Two franchises had already been taken into public ownership under the operator of last resort procedure: East Coast (since 2018) and Northern (since 1 March 2020).
 Three franchises expired during 2020. Great Western and South Eastern signed new franchise agreements which run alongside their emergency agreements, and Arriva's Cross Country franchise was extended to October 2023 under a direct award agreement. Commercial arrangements for all three are consistent with the ERMAs.
In a further move away from franchising, in December DfT agreed a direct award management contract with South Western Railway to run for at least two years following the end of their emergency agreement in April 2021, similarly with Avanti West Coast for at least four years from April 2022,
and GWR for three years from June 2022.
 One franchise was taken into public ownership under the operator of last resort procedure in 2021: Transport for Wales Rail by the Welsh Government.
 One franchise was taken into public ownership under the same procedure later in 2021: Southeastern, owned by Govia was terminated on 16 October 2021 and transferred to Southeastern owned by Department for Transport.
 One franchise was taken into public ownership under the same procedure in 2022: after Abellio's ScotRail franchise finished at the end of March 2022, services were transferred to ScotRail Trains, owned by the Scottish Government on 1 April 2022.

Competition inquiries
Whenever there is a possibility through the franchising process for multiple franchises to come into the common ownership of a larger transport group, these can lead to referrals to the competition authorities for investigation (currently the Competition & Markets Authority (CMA)), if it is deemed there is a concern that market dominance might result in a monopoly. This can also be triggered when there is an overlap between train and bus services in a particular area or corridor (most bus and coach services in Great Britain having been privatised in the 1980s).

Many investigations are cancelled without conclusion, simply because the concerning situation does not arise (i.e. a different company wins the bid). Investigations are also often closed with no action, after it is found there is little concern (such as in cases where the operator has little-to-no ability to create a monopoly situation in practice, even though they may control large areas of services). Where a concern is found to be significant, it is often resolved through the operators agreeing to certain undertakings designed to prevent the monopoly situation occurring, although in some cases investigations will conclude there is no alternative but to block the proposed contract.

Investigations which resulted in undertakings are as follows:

 Stagecoach / East Coast (2015)
 Arriva / Wales & Borders (2004)
 First / ScotRail (2004)
 National Express' acquisition of Prism Rail (2000)
 National Express / Midland Main Line (1996)

In February 2017 the Transport Select Committee concluded that the rail franchising model was "no longer fit for purpose" and was failing passengers, and recommended that the Transport Secretary Chris Grayling should instigate an independent review.

Controversies

Public/private ownership
According to the Railways Act 1993, the public sector cannot bid for rail franchises in Great Britain, although some rail franchises in the past have been taken on temporarily by a state-owned operation following an unsuccessful private franchise.

Some critics of the franchising system have suggested that state-owned organisations, such as the Government-owned holding company set up to take temporary ownership of franchises, Directly Operated Railways, should be allowed to tender for rail franchises on a permanent basis. They highlight the fact that many of the current rail franchise holders are actually joint ventures involving subsidiary companies of the state-owned railways of other countries, such as SNCF of France or the German Deutsche Bahn.

Some commentators have criticised the re-franchising deals by comparing the performance of the private-sector franchisees unfavourably with the public-sector operators. Advocates of the franchising system contrast public-sector operations with commercial operators, citing their ability to invest private capital into the franchises, financial returns to the Treasury and customer incentives such as free on-board Wi-Fi and loyalty card schemes.

West Coast upgrade delay 
In the wider context of the controversy over Railtrack's failure to upgrade the West Coast Main Line, there was criticism of the SRA for failing to ensure the Cross Country and West Coast franchises transitioned from subsidised to premium-paying franchises. This had been anticipated in the initial 15-year franchise agreement that ran from 1997 to 2012; but depended on Railtrack delivering the upgrade on time. Instead, the delays meant the contracts had to be renegotiated early as management contracts, and continued to be subsidised for several years until they could be re-let, which was seen as a cost to the public purse, adding millions to the billions run up in over-spend on the upgrade itself.

The initial management contracts came into effect on 22 July 2002, and were to see the West Coast franchise supported by the SRA until March 2003, and if agreement on a new franchise terms was not reached by then, the management contract would continue, in return for a fee of 2% of revenue. Similarly, Cross Country would be supported until March 2004, and then by a 1% fee if not renegotiated, but with the option of the SRA putting it out to tender. Unhappy with Virgin's proposal for terms of the remainder of the original 15-year Cross Country franchise, the SRA terminated negotiations on 6 August 2004 and the temporary arrangements continued until the franchise was re-let in a revised form, announced in October 2005. Although Virgin was shortlisted as a bidder for this revised franchise, it lost out to Arriva, who took over as the new franchisee from 11 November 2007.

West Coast re-tendering (2012)

In 2012 the franchising system ran into some difficulty; the Department for Transport awarded the InterCity West Coast franchise to FirstGroup, but in October the Secretary of State for Transport reversed this decision after significant technical flaws had been revealed in the way the franchise process was conducted. Virgin Trains was given a temporary management contract to run the franchise until a fresh competition could be run.

InterCity East Coast franchise failures

In December 2006 Sea Containers, which had held the InterCity East Coast franchise through its Great North Eastern Railway TOC since 1996, was stripped of its contract six years before it would have expired, due to financial difficulties. The franchise was re-tendered and awarded to National Express in August 2007; GNER continued to operate the franchise on a management contract basis until December 2007, when services transferred to the new National Express East Coast TOC. By early 2009, NXEC had itself run into financial difficulties due to the recession; after the government refused to renegotiate the terms of National Express's contract, it was announced in July 2009 that the franchise would return to state ownership. Services duly transferred to the new, publicly-owned East Coast TOC in November 2009.

The franchise was eventually re-tendered and awarded to a joint venture between Stagecoach and Virgin in November 2014, with services transferring to the new Virgin Trains East Coast TOC in March 2015. By June 2017 VTEC, like GNER and NXEC before it, had run into financial trouble, with Stagecoach attempting to renegotiate the terms of the contract. In May 2018 it was announced that the franchise would return to state ownership again, with services duly transferring to the new, publicly-owned London North Eastern Railway TOC the following month.

Bidding process (2003)
The 2003 purchase of GB Railways by FirstGroup was seen by some as an attempt by First to bypass the franchising system: GB were the holders of the Anglia Railways franchise, which was being re-tendered at the time. First had already been rejected for the shortlist of three bidders, which included the incumbent. Responding to media criticism that he had been "outmanoeuvred" by First, the head of the SRA argued that he could not decide who would become a preferred bidder based on what might happen in future regarding mergers and acquisitions. The purchase went through, but GB was unsuccessful in winning the Anglia franchise, as well as two others it was bidding for (Northern and Wales & Borders).

Failed Network SouthCentral franchise (2003)
In October 2000, after passenger complaints, the SRA announced that Connex would be losing its contract to run the Network SouthCentral franchise on its expiry in 2003, which it had been operating through its Connex South Central TOC. Having announced the new operator (from 2003) would be Southern, a Govia subsidiary, the South Central TOC was sold to Govia in 2001 as a way of terminating their involvement early and cutting their losses. In November 2003, Connex was stripped of its only other UK rail operation, the Connex South Eastern TOC running the South Eastern franchise, eight years before it would have expired, due to poor financial management. It was replaced by a new, publicly owned TOC, South Eastern Trains. The franchise was eventually returned to the private sector through re-tendering, which saw it pass to the Southeastern TOC April 2006 as part of the newly created Integrated Kent franchise.

See also
Campaign to Bring Back British Rail
Financing of the rail industry in Great Britain
History of rail transport in Great Britain 1995 to date
Impact of the privatisation of British Rail
List of companies operating trains in the United Kingdom
Train operating company – includes a timeline of changes to rail franchises since 1994

References

External links
 Rail franchising – Department for Transport
 Rail passenger franchising up to October 2012 – Department for Transport, February 2013

Passenger rail transport in the United Kingdom
 
Franchising
 
Transport policy in the United Kingdom
2020 disestablishments in the United Kingdom